Tetracystis is a genus of green algae, in the family Chlorococcaceae.

Species list
 T. aeria
 T. aggregata
 T. aplanospora
 T. compacta
 T. diplobionticoidea
 T. dissociata
 T. elliptica
 T. excentrica
 T. fissurata
 T. illinoisensis
 T. intermedia
 T. isobilateralis
 T. macrostigmata
 T. micropyrenoides
 T. nagasakiensis
 T. pampae
 T. pulchra
 T. sarcinalis
 T. tetraspora
 T. texensis
 T. vinatzeri

References

External links

Chlorococcaceae
Chlorococcaceae genera